Lyerly Building for Boys, also known as Nazareth Orphans' Home, Nazareth Children's Home or Nazareth Child & Family Connection, is a historic orphanage located at Gold Hill Township, Rowan County, North Carolina.  It was built between 1913 and 1916, and is a two-story, front gabled, vernacular Gothic Revival style granite building.  It has a steeply pitched parapeted slate roof.  The building housed a school and chapel in the first floor with boys dormitory above.

It was listed on the National Register of Historic Places in 1988.

References

External links
Nazareth Children’s Home website

Orphanages in North Carolina
Residential buildings on the National Register of Historic Places in North Carolina
Gothic Revival architecture in North Carolina
Residential buildings completed in 1916
Buildings and structures in Rowan County, North Carolina
National Register of Historic Places in Rowan County, North Carolina